Piotr Stępień (born 24 October 1963 in Kamieńsk) is a Polish wrestler (Greco-Roman style)

External links
 
 
 Sports123.com
 FILA Wrestling Database

1963 births
Living people
Olympic silver medalists for Poland
Olympic wrestlers of Poland
Wrestlers at the 1992 Summer Olympics
Polish male sport wrestlers
Olympic medalists in wrestling
People from Radomsko County
Sportspeople from Łódź Voivodeship
Medalists at the 1992 Summer Olympics
20th-century Polish people
21st-century Polish people